Heat Team is a 2004 Hong Kong action film directed by Dante Lam and starring Aaron Kwok, Eason Chan and Yumiko Cheng.

Plot
Lee Yiu-ting (Aaron Kwok) and Wong Kai-chung (Eason Chan) are police officers of the Regional Crime Unit of Hong Kong Island and Kowloon respectively. Both of them are ace marksmen, as well as being very agile. They are elite members of the police force who have never met.

Regional Crime Unit Superintendent Cheung Tit-chu (Danny Lee) had received information that international thief Ken Ma (Wong Ban-yuen) has secretly entered Hong Kong for a heist. Superintendent Cheung decides to organize a special operation group with elite members of the police force to take down international criminals, and Chung and Ting were recruited to the group.

Ken plans to lead his gang in a heist to steal a priceless diamond necklace. Ken and his girlfriend To Yu-fung (Victoria Wu), a jewelry appraiser, plan to retire after the heist and leave to distant parts. Ting, Chung, alongside their new female superior Fung Po-po (Yumiko Cheng) work together to investigate the whereabouts of the stolen necklace. However, the three of them do not trust each other and cause many disputes while competing for the best performance. While on the thread-less occasion, Yu-fung appears and makes a deal with the police that she will hand out the necklace if they would find and rescue Ken. At this time, Yu-fung is also being hunted by gangsters. To ensure her safety, Ting and Chung were assigned to protect Yu-fung. Since then, the relationship between them have turned from hostile to delicate and sensitive. The movie ends with Ting leaving the hospital ward after visiting Chung to recuperate from his gun shot injury.

Cast
 Aaron Kwok as Lee Yu-ting
 Eason Chan as Wong Kai-chung
 Yumiko Cheng as Fung Po-Po
 Dave Wong as Yuen Pak-chun
 Wong Ban-yuen as Ken Ma Lam
 Danny Lee as Cheung Tit-chu
 Victoria Wu as To Yu-fung
 Benz Hui as Mr. Fok
 Carl Ng as Santos
 Cheuk Wan-chi as Amy
 Jude Poyer as Jude
 Jim Chim as Dr. Vincent Chu Yan
 Bernice Liu as Macy
 Jeff Kam as Luk On-tung
 Benjamin Yuen as Shun Chai
 Alex To Kong as Ka-kit
 Tommy Wong as Chef in opening sequence
 Leung Wai-yan as Susan
 Lam Chi-pao as Siu Ko
 Andy Lau Tin-lung as Eddie
 Tam Shiu-ka as Michael
 Hung Chiu as Michael Ng Chi-wah

Reception

Critical
Beyond Hollywood gave the film a mixed review and wrote, "When all is said and done, I suppose “Heat Team” is a breezy enough way to lose 95 minutes of free time. It’s not the worst of the bunch, but you can’t help but think that it could have been much better if the comedy was jettisoned completely and the whole thing was played with a straight face." Love HK Film also gave the film a mixed review and wrote "Heat Team is occasionally amusing and even fun, but don't expect it to make any sense."

Box office
The film grossed HK$1,603,003 at the box office during its theatrical run from 24 June to 21 July 2004 in Hong Kong.

See also
 Aaron Kwok filmography
 Eason Chan filmography

References

External links
 
 
 Heat Team at Hong Kong Cinemagic

2004 films
2004 action comedy films
2000s buddy cop films
2000s crime comedy films
2000s heist films
Hong Kong action comedy films
Hong Kong buddy films
Gun fu films
Hong Kong heist films
Police detective films
2000s Cantonese-language films
Films directed by Dante Lam
Films set in Hong Kong
Films shot in Hong Kong
2004 comedy films
2000s Hong Kong films